FC Sireți is a Moldovan football club based in Sireți, Moldova. They play in the Moldovan "B" Division, the third division in Moldovan football in season 2017 and won Division B Center, with the right to promote to Moldovan "A" Division.

Achievements
Divizia B
Winners (1): 2017

External links
Sireți on Soccerway.com

Football clubs in Moldova
Association football clubs established in 2017
2017 establishments in Moldova